The London Greek Film Festival is an international film festival focusing on Greek films and Greek filmmakers.

Held every October in London, the festival is open to films either by Greek filmmakers or set in Greece or involving Greek history or mythology. The festival was founded in 2007.

The festival's artistic director is Christos Prosylis.

In 2013, Lizz Njagah won the best actress award for her performance in “The Return of Lazarus”, directed by her husband, Alexandros Konstantaras.

Odysseus awards

Awards fiction feature films

Multiple award winners

 Vassilis Mazomenos (2012, 2013, 2017,2020)

References

External links

 London Greek Film Festival at IMDB.

Film festivals in London
Greek film awards
2007 establishments in the United Kingdom